The Berlin Conference of 1884–1885, also known as the Congo Conference or West Africa Conference, met on November 15, 1884, and after an adjournment concluded on February 26, 1885, with the signature of a General Act, regulating the European colonisation and trade in Africa during the New Imperialism period. The conference was organized by Otto von Bismarck, the first chancellor of Germany at the request of King Leopold II. The General Act of Berlin can be seen as the formalisation of the Scramble for Africa which was already in full swing. Some historians however warn against an overemphasis of its role in the colonial partitioning of Africa, and draw attention to bilateral agreements concluded before and after the conference. The conference contributed to ushering in a period of heightened colonial activity by European powers, once made the point that the Berlin Conference of 1884–85 was responsible for "the old carve-up of Africa". Other writers have also laid the blame in "the partition of Africa" on the doors of the Berlin Conference. But Wm. Roger Louis holds a contrary view, although he conceded that "the Berlin Act did have a relevance to the course of the partition" of Africa. Of the fourteen countries being represented, seven of them – Austria-Hungary, Russia, Denmark, the Netherlands, Sweden–Norway, the Ottoman Empire and the United States – came home without any formal possessions in Africa.

Background 

Prior to the conference, European diplomats approached governments in Africa in the same manner as they did in the Western Hemisphere by establishing a connection to local trade networks. In the early 1800s, the European demand for ivory, which was then often used in the production of luxury goods, led many European merchants into the interior markets of Africa. European spheres of power and influence were limited to coastal Africa at this time as Europeans had only established trading posts (protected by gunboats) up to this point.

In 1876, King Leopold II of Belgium, who had founded and controlled the International African Association the same year, invited Henry Morton Stanley to join him in researching and "civilizing" the continent. In 1878, the International Congo Society was also formed, with more economic goals but still closely related to the former society. Leopold secretly bought off the foreign investors in the Congo Society, which was turned to imperialistic goals, with the "African Society" serving primarily as a philanthropic front.

From 1878 to 1885, Stanley returned to the Congo not as a reporter but as Leopold's agent, with the secret mission to organise what would become known as the Congo Free State soon after the closure of the Berlin Conference in August 1885. French agents discovered Leopold's plans, and in response France sent its own explorers to Africa. In 1881, French naval officer Pierre de Brazza was dispatched to central Africa, travelled into the western Congo basin, and raised the French flag over the newly founded Brazzaville in what is now the Republic of Congo. Finally, Portugal, which had essentially abandoned a colonial empire in the area, long held through the mostly defunct proxy Kingdom of Kongo, also claimed the area, based on old treaties with Restoration-era Spain and the Catholic Church. It quickly made a treaty on 26 February 1884 with its former ally, Great Britain, to block off the Congo Society's access to the Atlantic.

By the early 1880s, many factors including diplomatic successes, greater European local knowledge, and the demand for resources such as gold, timber, and rubber, triggered dramatically increased European involvement in the continent of Africa. Stanley's charting of the Congo River Basin (1874–1877) removed the last  from European maps of the continent, delineating the areas of British, Portuguese, French and Belgian control. These European nations raced to annex territory that might be claimed by rivals.

France moved to take over Tunisia, one of the last of the Barbary states, using a claim of another piracy incident. French claims by Pierre de Brazza were quickly acted on by the French military, which took control of what is now the Republic of the Congo in 1881 and Guinea in 1884. Italy became part of the Triple Alliance, an event that upset Bismarck's carefully laid plans and led Germany to join the European invasion of Africa.

In 1882, realizing the geopolitical extent of Portuguese control on the coasts, but seeing penetration by France eastward across Central Africa toward Ethiopia, the Nile, and the Suez Canal, Britain saw its vital trade route through Egypt to India threatened. Under the pretext of the collapsed Egyptian financing and a subsequent mutiny in which hundreds of British subjects were murdered or injured, Britain intervened in the nominally Ottoman Egypt, which it controlled for decades.

Conference
The European race for colonialism made Germany start launching expeditions of its own, which frightened both British and French statesmen. Hoping to quickly soothe the brewing conflict, Belgian King Leopold II convinced France and Germany that common trade in Africa was in the best interests of all three countries. Under support from the British and the initiative of Portugal, Otto von Bismarck, the Chancellor of Germany, called on representatives of 13 nations in Europe as well as the United States to take part in the Berlin Conference in 1884 to work out a joint policy on the African continent.

The conference was opened on 15 November 1884, and continued until it closed on 26 February 1885. The number of plenipotentiaries varied per nation, but these 14 countries sent representatives to attend the Berlin Conference and sign the subsequent Berlin Act:

Uniquely, the United States reserved the right to decline or to accept the conclusions of the conference.

General Act
The General Act fixed the following points:
 Partly to gain public acceptance, the conference resolved to end slavery by African and Islamic powers. Thus, an international prohibition of the slave trade throughout their respected spheres was signed by the European members. In his novella Heart of Darkness, Joseph Conrad sarcastically referred to one of the participants at the conference, the International Association of the Congo (also called "International Congo Society"), as "the International Society for the Suppression of Savage Customs". The first name of this Society had been the "International Association for the Exploration and Civilization of Central Africa".
 The properties occupied by Belgian King Leopold's International Congo Society, the name used in the General Act, were confirmed as the Society's. On 1 August 1885, a few months after the closure of the Berlin Conference, Leopold's Vice-Administrator General in the Congo, Francis de Winton, announced that the territory was henceforth called "the Congo Free State", a name that in fact was not in use at the time of the conference and does not appear in the General Act. The Belgian official Law Gazette later stated that from that same 1 August 1885 onwards, Leopold II was to be considered "Sovereign" of the new state, again an issue never discussed, let alone decided, at the Berlin Conference. 
 The 14 signatory powers would have free trade throughout the Congo Basin as well as Lake Malawi and east of it in an area south of 5° N.
 The Niger and Congo rivers were made free for ship traffic.
 The Principle of Effective Occupation (based on "effective occupation", see below) was introduced to prevent powers from setting up colonies in name only.
 Any fresh act of taking possession of any portion of the African coast would have to be notified by the power taking possession, or assuming a protectorate, to the other signatory powers.
 Definition of regions in which each European power had an exclusive right to pursue the legal ownership of land

The first reference in an international act to the obligations attaching to "spheres of influence" is contained in the Berlin Act.

Principle of effective occupation 

The principle of effective occupation stated that powers could acquire rights over colonial lands only if they possessed them or had "effective occupation": if they had treaties with local leaders, flew their flag there and established an administration in the territory to govern it with a police force to keep order. The colonial power could also make use of the colony economically. That principle became important not only as a basis for the European powers to acquire territorial sovereignty in Africa but also for determining the limits of their respective overseas possessions, as effective occupation served in some instances as a criterion for settling disputes over the boundaries between colonies. However, as the Berlin Act was limited in its scope to the lands that fronted on the African coast, European powers in numerous instances later claimed rights over lands in the interior without demonstrating the requirement of effective occupation, as articulated in Article 35 of the Final Act.

At the Berlin Conference, the scope of the Principle of Effective Occupation was heavily contested between Germany and France. The Germans, who were new to the continent, essentially believed that as far as the extension of power in Africa was concerned, no colonial power should have any legal right to a territory unless the state exercised strong and effective political control and, if so, only for a limited period of time, essentially an occupational force only. However, Britain's view was that Germany was a latecomer to the continent and was assumptively unlikely to gain any new possessions, apart from territories that were already occupied, which were swiftly proving to be more valuable than those occupied by Britain. That logic caused it to be generally assumed by Britain and France that Germany had an interest in embarrassing the other European powers on the continent and forcing them to give up their possessions if they could not muster a strong political presence. On the other side, Britain had large territorial holdings there and wanted to keep them while it minimised its responsibilities and administrative costs. In the end, the British view prevailed.

The disinclination to rule what the Europeans had conquered is apparent throughout the protocols of the Berlin Conference but especially in the Principle of Effective Occupation. In line with Germany and Britain's opposing views, the powers finally agreed that it could be established by a European power establishing some kind of base on the coast from which it was free to expand into the interior. The Europeans did not believe that the rules of occupation demanded European hegemony on the ground. The Belgians originally wanted to include that "effective occupation" required provisions that "cause peace to be administered", but Britain and France were the powers that had that amendment struck out of the final document.

That principle, along with others that were written at the conference, allowed the Europeans to conquer Africa but to do as little as possible to administer or control it. The principle did not apply so much to the hinterlands of Africa at the time of the conference. This gave rise to "hinterland theory", which basically gave any colonial power with coastal territory the right to claim political influence over an indefinite amount of inland territory. Since Africa was irregularly shaped, that theory caused problems and was later rejected.

Agenda
 Portugal–Britain: The Portuguese government presented a project, known as the "Pink Map", or the "Rose-Coloured Map", in which the colonies of Angola and Mozambique were united by co-option of the intervening territory (the land later became Zambia, Zimbabwe, and Malawi). All of the countries attending the conference, except for Britain, endorsed Portugal's ambitions, and just over five years later, in 1890, the British government issued an ultimatum that demanded for the Portuguese to withdraw from the disputed area.
 France–Britain: A line running from Say in Niger to Maroua, on the northeastern coast of Lake Chad, determined which part belonged to whom. France would own territory to the north of the line, and Britain would own territory to the south of it. The basin of the Nile would be British, with the French taking the basin of Lake Chad. Furthermore, between the 11th and 15th degrees north in latitude, the border would pass between Ouaddaï, which would be French, and Darfur in Sudan, which would be British. In reality, a no man's land 200 km wide was put in place between the 21st and 23rd meridians east.
 France–Germany: The area to the north of a line, formed by the intersection of the 14th meridian east and Miltou, was designated to be French, and the area to the south would be German, later called German Cameroon.
 Britain–Germany: The separation came in the form of a line passing through Yola, on the Benue, Dekoa, going up to the extremity of Lake Chad.
 France–Italy: Italy was to own what lies north of a line from the intersection of the Tropic of Cancer and the 17th meridian east to the intersection of the 15th parallel north and the 21st meridian east.

Aftermath

The conference provided an opportunity to channel latent European hostilities towards one another outward; provide new areas for helping the European powers expand in the face of rising American, Russian and Japanese interests; and form constructive dialogue to limit future hostilities. In Africa, colonialism was introduced across nearly all the continent. When African independence was regained after World War II, it was in the form of fragmented states.

The Scramble for Africa sped up after the Conference since even within areas designated as their sphere of influence, the European powers had to take effective possession by the principle of effectivity. In central Africa in particular, expeditions were dispatched to coerce traditional rulers into signing treaties, using force if necessary, such as was the case for Msiri, King of Katanga, in 1891. Bedouin- and Berber-ruled states in the Sahara and the Sahel were overrun by the French in several wars by the beginning of World War I. The British moved up from South Africa and down from Egypt and conquered states such as the Mahdist State and the Sultanate of Zanzibar and, having already defeated the Zulu Kingdom in South Africa in 1879, moved on to subdue and dismantle the independent Boer republics of Transvaal and the Orange Free State.

Within a few years, Africa was at least nominally divided up south of the Sahara. By 1895, the only independent states were:

 , involved in colonial conflicts with Spain and France, which conquered the nation in the early 20th century.

 , founded with the support of the United States for freed slaves to return to Africa.

 , which fended off Italian invasion from Eritrea in the First Italo-Ethiopian War of 1895–1896 but fell to Italian occupation in 1936 defeat during the Second Italo-Ethiopian War

  Majeerteen Sultanate, founded in the early 18th century, it was annexed by Italy in the 20th century.

  Sultanate of Hobyo, carved out of the former Majeerteen Sultanate, which ruled northern Somalia until the 20th century, when it was incorporated by Italy.

The following states lost their independence to the British Empire roughly a decade after (see below for more information):

 , a Boer republic founded by Dutch settlers.

  (Transvaal), also a Boer republic

By 1902, 90% of all the land that makes up Africa was under European control. Most of the Sahara was French, but after the quelling of the Mahdi rebellion and the ending of the Fashoda crisis, the Sudan remained firmly under joint British–Egyptian rulership, with Egypt being under British occupation before becoming a British protectorate in 1914.

The Boer republics were conquered by the British in the Second Boer War from 1899 to 1902. Libya was conquered by Italy in 1911, and Morocco was divided between the French and Spanish in 1912.

Motives and David Livingstone's Crusade 
One of the chief stated justifications "was a desire to stamp out slavery once and for all". Before his death in 1873, Christian missionary, David Livingstone, called for a worldwide crusade to defeat the Arab-controlled slave trade in East Africa. The way to do it was to "liberate Africa" by introduction of "commerce, Christianity" and civilization.

Crowe, Craven and Katzenellenbogen are authors who have attempted to soften the language and therefore the intent of the conference. They warn against an overemphasis of its role in the colonial partitioning of Africa, extensively justifying it by ignoring the motivations and outcomes of the conference by only drawing attention to bilateral agreements concluded before and after the conference, regardless of whether they were finalized and followed in practice. For example, Craven has questioned the legal and economic impact of the conference. 

However, the countries that ultimately participated in the Final Act ignored requirements set forth within it to establish their satellite governments, rights to the land and trade in the benefit of their national, domestic economies.

Analysis by historians 

Historians have long marked the Berlin Conference as the formalisation of the Scramble for Africa but recently, scholars have questioned the legal and economic impact of the conference.

Some have argued the conference central to imperialism. African American historian W. E. B. Du Bois wrote in 1948 that alongside the Atlantic slave trade in Africans a great world movement of modern times is "the partitioning of Africa after the Franco-Prussian War which, with the Berlin Conference of 1884, brought colonial imperialism to flower" and that "[t]he primary reality of imperialism in Africa today is economic," going on to expound on the extraction of wealth from the continent.

Other historians focus on the legal implications in international law and argue that the conference was only one of many (mostly bilateral) agreements between prospective colonists, which took place after the conference.

See also
Brussels Anti-Slavery Conference 1889–90
Impact of Western European colonialism and colonisation

References

Sources
 Chamberlain, Muriel E. (2014). The Scramble for Africa. London: Longman, 1974, 4th edn. .
Craven, M. 2015. "Between law and history: the Berlin Conference of 1884–1885 and the logic of free trade." London Review of International Law 3, 31–59.
 Crowe, Sybil E. (1942). The Berlin West African Conference, 1884–1885. New York: Longmans, Green.  (1981, New ed. edition).
 Förster, Stig, Wolfgang Justin Mommsen, and Ronald Edward Robinson, eds. Bismarck, Europe and Africa: The Berlin Africa conference 1884–1885 and the onset of partition (Oxford University Press, 1988) online; 30 topical chapters by experts.
 Hochschild, Adam (1999). King Leopold's Ghost. .
Katzenellenbogen, S. 1996. It didn't happen at Berlin: Politics, economics and ignorance in the setting of Africa's colonial boundaries. In Nugent, P. and Asiwaju, A. I. (Eds.), African boundaries: Barriers, conduits and opportunities. pp. 21–34. London: Pinter.
 Petringa, Maria (2006). Brazza, A Life for Africa. .
 Lorin, Amaury, and de Gemeaux, Christine, eds., L'Europe coloniale et le grand tournant de la Conférence de Berlin (1884–1885), Paris, Le Manuscrit, coll. "Carrefours d'empires", 2013, 380 p.

Further reading
 Craven, Matthew. The invention of a tradition: Westlake, the Berlin Conference and the historicisation of international law (Klosterman, 2012).
 Leon, Daniel De (1886). "The Conference at Berlin on the West-African Question". Political Science Quarterly 1(1).
 Förster, Susanne, et al. "Negotiating German colonial heritage in Berlin's Afrikanisches Viertel." International Journal of Heritage Studies 22.7 (2016): 515–529.
 Frankema, Ewout, Jeffrey G. Williamson, and P. J. Woltjer. "An economic rationale for the West African scramble? The commercial transition and the commodity price boom of 1835–1885." Journal of Economic History (2018): 231–267. online
 Harlow, Barbara, and Mia Carter, eds. Archives of Empire: Volume 2. The Scramble for Africa (Duke University Press, 2020).
 Mulligan, William. "The Anti-slave Trade Campaign in Europe, 1888–90." in A Global History of Anti-slavery Politics in the Nineteenth Century (Palgrave Macmillan, London, 2013). 149–170 online.
 Nuzzo, Luigi (2012), Colonial Law, EGO – European History Online, Mainz: Institute of European History. Retrieved 25 March 2021 (pdf).
 Rodney, Walter. How Europe Underdeveloped Africa (1972) –
 Shepperson, George. "The Centennial of the West African Conference of Berlin, 1884–1885." Phylon 46#1 (1985), pp. 37–48. online
 Vanthemsche, Guy. Belgium and the Congo, 1885–1980 (Cambridge University Press, 2012). 289 pp. ISBN 978-0-521-19421-1
 Waller, Bruce. Bismarck at the crossroads: the reorientation of German foreign policy after the Congress of Berlin, 1878–1880 (1974) online
 Yao, Joanne (2022). "The Power of Geographical Imaginaries in the European International Order: Colonialism, the 1884–85 Berlin Conference, and Model International Organizations". International Organization.

External links

 Geography.about.com – Berlin Conference of 1884–1885 to Divide Africa.
 "The Berlin Conference", BBC In Our Time
 General Act of the Berlin Conference. South African History Online.

European colonisation in Africa
1884 in Germany
1885 in Germany
Diplomatic conferences in Germany
19th-century diplomatic conferences
1884 in international relations
1885 in international relations
1884 conferences
1885 conferences
1885 in Africa
1884 in Africa
19th century in Berlin
1880s in Prussia